The Trevecca Nazarene University Trojans are an NCAA Division II member with 15 intercollegiate teams representing Trevecca Nazarene University in the heart of Nashville, Tennessee. 

The 15 teams are men's basketball, women's basketball, baseball, softball, men's soccer, women's soccer, volleyball, men's cross country, women's cross country, men's golf, women's golf, men's indoor track and field, women's indoor track and field, men's outdoor track and field, and women's outdoor track and field.

Overview
The first intercollegiate team is men's basketball led by Elmer Heaberlin in 1969. Dr. Mark R. Moore was president. Baseball was added next and led by Bill Green. The first championship came with the 1972-1973 men's basketball team. Bill Boner replaced Elmer Heaberlin as men's coach and later went on to be a US Congressmen and Mayor of Nashville.

The first All-American for Trevecca is Kenny Thomas who later coached at Volunteer State Community College and then at USC-Aiken.   

The athletic director at Trevecca is Mark Elliott, a former Vanderbilt University baseball and basketball player. He later played in the NY Mets organization in the same outfield as Darryl Strawberry and Billy Beane. 

The voice of the Trojans and sports information director is Gregory Ruff. Ruff has worked in local media for year before and during his time at Trevecca, Ruff broadcast for Vanderbilt University, Belmont University, as well as the Nashville Stars.

Sports Teams

Basketball
Trevecca's basketball team first made a trip to the NAIA National Tournament in 1987. The team defeated defending national champion Lipscomb College in the District 24 Tournament, then reached the Elite Eight in Kansas City at Kemper Arena. The team was led by head coach Frank Wilson. Trevecca point guard Avery Patton as an All-American and a member of the NAIA National Tournament team.   

David Suddeth is the all-time leading scorer in Trevecca basketball history, he scored 3004 points on the way to earning All-American honors. Suddeth is one of a few college basketball (less than 40 at all NCAA or NAIA Divisions) athletes to score more than 3000 career points.    

Trevecca's first four-time All-American is women's basketball star Jennifer Wilson, the daughter of former men's basketball coach Frank Wilson. Both Frank and Jennifer are in the Trevecca Hall of Fame, they were inducted together.

Baseball
Trevecca has a storied baseball program that reached the NCAA Division II College World Series in Cary, NC in 2021.   

The Trojans have had a number of players drafted in the MLB Amateur Draft.  

The last is Hunter Newman (JR/Chapmansboro, Tenn.), an all-American third baseman, was drafted by the St. Louis Cardinals in the 22nd round with the 671st pick. The previous two Trojans drafted in the Major League Baseball (MLB) Amateur Draft were PJ Francescon and Craig Stem. Both were drafted in the 2011 draft.   

Newman is an American Baseball Coaches Association (ABCA)/Rawlings All-American. Is a third-team member of the 2015 Daktronics All-American team, making him the first Trevecca or Great Midwest Athletic Conference (G-MAC) player to make that team. Two organizations, the ABCA/Rawlings and Daktronics, named him their 2015 Midwest Player of the Year. He is the 2015 G-MAC Player of the Year, a G-MAC first team all-conference selection, a ABCA/Rawlings ⁯Midwest Region first team honoree, a Daktronics Midwest Region first teamer, and honored as a NCBWA Midwest Region first team member.   

Francescon, from Nolensville, Tenn., was drafted by the Chicago Cubs in the 40th round while Stem was taken by the Los Angeles Dodgers in the 15th round, he was the 464th overall pick, just one pick behind former Trojan Brad Coon who was the 463rd pick in 2005.

2011 was the first time Trevecca has ever had two players drafted in the same year.

Coon, who reached Triple-A Salt Lake for more than a season, was drafted by the Los Angeles Angels of Anaheim in the 15th round of the 2005 MLB Amateur Draft. Coon now serves and an assistant for former Trevecca coach Jeff Forehand at Lipscomb University. Coon was elected to the Trevecca Athletic Hall of Fame.

Former TNU pitcher and Coon's teammate B.J. Jenkins was taken by the San Diego Padres in the 28th round in the 2004 MLB Draft.

Former Trevecca pitcher Tim Dunn was drafted by the Cincinnati Reds in the 46th round of the 2009 draft. Dunn returned for his senior season at Trevecca, but an arm injury prevented him from being drafted again in 2010.  

Trevecca outfielder Mario Campos was a 29th round selection by the Boston Red Sox in the 2001 draft.

Another Trojan outfielder, Seth Richmond, was taken in the 1983 draft when the Houston Astros picked him in the 24th round.

Mike Mills, who pitched his senior year at Birmingham Southern but played for Trevecca his first three seasons, was drafted by the San Diego Padres in the seventh round of the 1983 MLB Amateur Draft. Mills, while with Trevecca, was drafted by the Cincinnati Reds in the 32nd round of the 1982 MLB Draft.

Trevecca has had several players signed by Major League teams. Rob Erwin, Keith Black, Eric Van Slyke, Luke Brown, Maurice Cole and Jeremy Todd were signed and played professional.

Stipe Miocic played baseball for Trevecca, the two-time UFC Heavy Weight champion was on the 2005 TranSouth Championship team coached by Jeff Forehand. Forehand played at Belmont University and later moved to coach Lipscomb University.

References